Florio is an Italian surname. Notable people with the surname include:
 Franca Florio (1873–1950), Italian noblewoman, socialite and a prominent protagonist of the Belle Époque.
 Ignazio Florio Sr. (1838–1891), Italian entrepreneur and politician
 Ignazio Florio Jr. (1869–1957)
 James Florio (1937-2022), American politician, 49th Governor of New Jersey
 John Florio (1553–1625), linguist and lexicographer 
 Massimo Florio, Professor of Public Economics and Chair of Economics of European Integration at the University of Milan
 Michelangelo Florio (1515–1572) Italian Franciscan friar convert to Protestantism, pastor in England and Switzerland, and father of John Florio
 Rudy Florio (born 1950), Canadian football player
 Vincenzo Florio Sr. (1799–1868), Italian entrepreneur and politician, founder of the rich Florio economic dynasty, one of the wealthiest Sicilian families during the late 19th century.
 Vincenzo Florio (1883–1959), Italian industrialist and founder of two automobile races

Italian-language surnames